Barry Glasgow is a former Australian professional rugby league player from the 1960s.

Barry Glasgow played for the Western Suburbs Magpies and North Sydney Bears in the 1960s & 70s. He was notable for his prolific field goal kicking ability.

References

Living people
Australian rugby league players
Western Suburbs Magpies players
North Sydney Bears players
Rugby league players from Sydney
Year of birth missing (living people)